Bangladesh competed at the 2018 Asian Games in Jakarta and Palembang, Indonesia, from 18 August to 2 September 2018. A total of 117 athletes from Bangladesh participating in 14 sports.

Competitors 
The following is a list of the number of competitors representing Bangladesh that participated at the Games:

Archery

Recurve

Compound

Athletics

Basketball 

Summary

3x3 basketball
Bangladesh national 3x3 team will participate in the Games. The men's team placed in pool B based on the FIBA 3x3 federation ranking.

Men's tournament

Roster
The following is the Bangladesh roster in the men's 3x3 basketball tournament of the 2018 Asian Games.
Mahfuzul Haque
Sajid Istiaque
Mostafa Chowdhury
Shahanur Rahman

Pool B

Contract bridge 

Men

Field hockey 

Bangladesh qualified a men's field hockey team after progressed to the semi-finals at the qualifying tournament in Muscat, Oman.

Summary

Men's tournament 

Roster

Pool B

Fifth place game

Football 

Bangladesh drawn in the Group B at the men's football event.

Summary

Men's tournament 

Roster

Pool B

Round of 16

Golf 

Bangladesh entered six golfers (4 men's and 2 women's) who competed in the individual and team event. Several national golf associations complained to the Court of Arbitration for Sport that Bangladesh has included professional golfers, but the CAS ruled that none of the players were professional.

Men

Women

Kabaddi

Summary

Men's tournament

Team roster

Masud Karim
Aruduzzaman Munshi
Md Ashraful Shaikh
Ziaur Rahman
Zakir Hossain
Md Sabuj Mia
Anwer Hossain
Fatin Fuhad
Md Ruhul Amin
Shazid Hossain
Arif Robban
Tuhin Tarafdar

Group A

Women's tournament

Team roster

Shahnaz Parvin Maleka
Rupali Akhter
Sharmin Sultana Rima
Shila Akhter
Fatema Akhter Poly
Hafiza Akther
Srity Khatun
Kochi Rani Mondal
Kohinur Begum
Shraboni Mollick
Rekha Akhter
Disha Moni Sorker

Group B

Rowing 

Men

Shooting 

Men

Women

Mixed team

Swimming

Men

Women

Volleyball

Beach volleyball

Weightlifting

Women

Wrestling 

Bangladesh competed at the Games with 3 wrestler (2 men's and 1 women's). The men's athletes was defeated in the early round, while the women's athlete failed to win the bronze medal after defeated in the repechage round.

Men's freestyle

Women's freestyle

References 

Nations at the 2018 Asian Games
2018
Asian Games